CNA Arena Akita is an arena in Rinkai-area, Akita, Japan. It is owned and run by the city. Cable Networks Akita acquired its naming rights in 2015. The silver-colored building opened in 1994 and holds 5,000 people. The gym has a dome-shaped 154 feet height ceiling, and added 2,088 extra seatings in 2016. It is the home arena of the Akita Northern Happinets of the B.League, Japan's professional basketball league. The biggest basketball court in Akita is Akita Prefectural Gymnasium.

Facilities
Main arena - 2,540m2 （63.5m×40m） 
Sub arena - 863m2 （38.0m×22m）
Table tennis room - 324m2
Multi-purpose hall - 324m2
Running course - 810m2

Sports Events
CNA Arena has hosted the following sports events:
 2001 World Games - Acrobatic gymnastics, Aerobic gymnastics, Rhythmic gymnastics, Dancesport, Trampoline gymnanastics 
 National Sports Festival of Japan - Gymnastics (2007)
 bj League All-Star Game (2014)
 Akita Masters

Sports events at former municipal gymnasium in Sannoh
 All-Japan Artistic Gymnastics Championships 20–23 November 1964, Akita City-born Yukio Endō won gold medals in individual all-around, silver medals in floor exercise, rings, vault, horizontal bar and bronze medal in parallel bars

Gallery

Drops of water
On January 9. 2018, it leaked on the court floor, and the basketball game was delayed. Other roof leaks are also reported.

Attendance records
The record for a basketball game is 4,951, set on November 30, 2022, when the Happinets defeated the Alvark Tokyo 83-69.

Access

From Akita Station:  for Rinkai Eigyosho, Kenritsu Pool. Get off at Shiritsu Taiikukan-mae.

References

External links
Aerial view
Bus stop at CNA Arena
CNA Arena video

Location map

2001 World Games
Acrobatic gymnastics at the 2001 World Games
Akita Northern Happinets
Sports venues in Akita Prefecture
Indoor arenas in Japan
Basketball venues in Japan
Boxing venues in Japan
Buildings and structures in Akita (city)
Postmodern architecture
Sports venues completed in 1994
1994 establishments in Japan
Badminton venues
Postmodern architecture in Japan